Hof bei Salzburg is a municipality in the district of Salzburg-Umgebung in the state of Salzburg in Austria.

The mezzo-soprano Rosl Zapf (1925–2019) was born in Hof bei Salzburg.

Geography 
Hof bei Salzburg is on the shore of the Fuschlsee and is surrounded by the Salzkammergut mountains. The town is on the Austrian motorway A1.

References

Cities and towns in Salzburg-Umgebung District